This article lists those who were potential candidates for the Republican nomination for Vice President of the United States in the 1952 election. After defeating Ohio Senator Robert A. Taft for the Republican presidential nomination at the 1952 Republican National Convention, General Dwight D. Eisenhower needed to choose a running mate. Taft recommended Illinois Senator Everett Dirksen, but Eisenhower rejected the suggestion. Eisenhower and his advisers put together a list of prominent Republicans who were acceptable to both the conservative Taft and liberal Dewey wings of the party, anti-Communist, talented at campaigning, relatively young (to balance Eisenhower's age), and who contributed to Eisenhower's nomination victory. After conferring with Republican Party leaders, Eisenhower decided to ask California Senator Richard Nixon to be his running mate; Nixon accepted the offer. Nixon had carefully campaigned for the post of vice president since meeting Eisenhower in 1951, and Nixon helped deliver the California delegation to Eisenhower in the presidential ballot. The Republican convention ratified Eisenhower's choice of Nixon. Months after the convention, Eisenhower considered asking Nixon to step down as running mate due to controversy surrounding campaign expenses, but Nixon rallied public opinion with his Checkers speech and remained on the ticket. The Eisenhower–Nixon ticket won the 1952 election, as well as the 1956 election, defeating the Stevenson–Sparkman and Stevenson–Kefauver tickets, respectively.

Potential running mates

Finalists
California Senator Richard Nixon
Massachusetts Senator & Co-Campaign Manager Henry Cabot Lodge, Jr.
Minnesota Representative Walter Judd
Indiana Representative Charles A. Halleck
California Senator William F. Knowland
Colorado Governor Daniel Thornton
Washington Governor Arthur B. Langlie

Others
Illinois Senator Everett Dirksen
Ohio Senator Robert Taft

See also
1952 Republican National Convention

References

Vice presidency of the United States
1952 United States presidential election
Dwight D. Eisenhower
Richard Nixon